The third season of the American television drama series Homeland premiered on September 29, 2013 on Showtime, and concluded on December 15, 2013, consisting of 12 episodes. The series is loosely based on the Israeli television series Hatufim (English: Prisoners of War) created by Gideon Raff and is developed for American television by Howard Gordon and Alex Gansa.

Set in the aftermath of the CIA bombing at the end of season 2, Nicholas Brody is now on the run, suspected of having delivered and activated the bomb despite both his and Carrie's protestations of his innocence. Saul Berenson is instituted as Acting Director of the CIA and establishes a grandiose plot to turn Major General Majid Javadi in order to have him influence policy for the United States in Iran.

Cast and characters

Main

 Claire Danes as Carrie Mathison, a CIA intelligence officer assigned to the Counterterrorism Center
 Damian Lewis as Nicholas Brody, a U.S. Marine  Sergeant and a Marine Scout Sniper who was rescued by Delta Force after being held by al-Qaeda as a prisoner of war for eight years
 Rupert Friend as Peter Quinn, a CIA black ops SOG/SAD operative
 Morena Baccarin as Jessica Brody, Nicholas Brody's wife
 Jackson Pace as Chris Brody, Nicholas Brody's son
 Morgan Saylor as Dana Brody, Nicholas Brody's daughter
 Sarita Choudhury as Mira Berenson, Saul's estranged wife
 Tracy Letts as Senator Andrew Lockhart, the power hungry, authoritative and commanding Committee Chairman
 F. Murray Abraham as Dar Adal, a retired black ops specialist
 Mandy Patinkin as Saul Berenson, the Acting Director of the CIA and Carrie's old boss and mentor

Recurring
 James Rebhorn as Frank Mathison, Carrie's father
 Tim Guinee as Scott Ryan, in charge of CIA special ops
 Sam Underwood as Leo Carras, a new friend of Dana's with a troubled past
 Gary Wilmes as Dr. Troy Richardson, a psychiatrist helping Dana Brody cope with recent events
 Nazanin Boniadi as Fara Sherazi, an intelligent, young and professional Persian analyst
 Jason Butler Harner as Paul Franklin
 David Marciano as Virgil Piotrowski, Carrie's contact
 Maury Sterling as Max Piotrowski, Virgil's brother
 Shaun Toub as Majid Javadi, the Iranian Deputy Intelligence Chief who masterminded the Langley bombing
 William Abadie as Alan Bernard, an international journalist
 William Sadler as Mike Higgins, the White House Chief of Staff

Special guest
 Navid Negahban as Abu Nazir, a high-ranking member of al-Qaeda.
 Chris Chalk as Tom Walker, a U.S. Marine who was captured along with Brody

Guest

 Amy Morton as Erin Kimball
 Pedro Pascal as David Portillo
 Joanna Merlin as Lois, Chris and Dana's grandmother
 Amy Hargreaves as Maggie Mathison, Carrie's sister and a psychiatrist
 David Aaron Baker as Dr. Harlan
 Stephen Schnetzer as Dr. Maloney
 Manny Pérez as El Niño
 Martina García as Esme
 Erik Todd Dellums as Dr. Graham
 Marcia DeBonis as Abby
 Jennifer Marsala as Amanda Lambert
 Diego Klattenhoff as Mike Faber, a U.S. Marine Major (formerly Captain). He was Nicholas's best friend who, assuming Nicholas was dead, began an affair with his wife.
 Martin Donovan as Leland Bennett, a partner in a Washington, D.C. law firm
 Stephanie J. Block as Patricia Cooper, a lawyer
 Mary Apick as Fariba, Majid Javadi's former wife
 Billy Smith as Special Agent Hall
 Clark Johnson as Detective Johnson
 Vincent Irizarry as Captain Lonza
 Chance Kelly as Mitchell Clawson
 Parviz Sayyad as Kourosh Sherazi, Fara's father
 Donnie Keshawarz as Hafez Azizi
 Jared Ward as Yousef Turani
 Walid Amini as Josh Modarres
 Jaylen Moore as Eric Baraz
 David Diaan as Masud Sherazi, Fara's uncle
 Houshang Touzie as General Danesh Akbari, the Iranian Intelligence Chief

Episodes

Production
On October 22, 2012, Homeland was renewed for a third season, consisting of 12 episodes, which premiered on September 29, 2013.

Production for the third season began in late May 2013, continuing in Charlotte, North Carolina. The series also filmed in Old San Juan, Puerto Rico, which stood in for Caracas, Venezuela. The series was also planning on returning to Israel for additional filming, but filming moved to Morocco, due to ongoing conflicts in Syria.

The third season has three previous guest actors–Rupert Friend, F. Murray Abraham and Sarita Choudhury–promoted to series regulars. Tracy Letts joined the cast playing Senator Andrew Lockhart, Chairman of Senate Select Committee on Intelligence, as a series regular. Diego Klattenhoff and David Marciano, who portray Mike Faber and Virgil, do not return as series regulars, but return in a recurring capacity. 

Barbara Hall joined as co-executive producer, after Meredith Stiehm left. James Yoshimura also joined as a writer and consulting producer. Writer Henry Bromell, who died on March 18, 2013, is credited as executive producer for the whole season. Lesli Linka Glatter, who directed the season 2 episode "Q&A", and former 24 co-executive producer and writer Patrick Harbinson both joined as co-executive producer. Michael Klick, who was credited as producer in the first two seasons, was promoted to co-executive producer. Claire Danes became a producer beginning with the third season. Former series writer Meredith Stiehm rejoined the writing staff near the end of the third season, including co-writing the season finale, after departing Homeland to write for her new TV series The Bridge. Stiehm will continue with the series through the fourth season and potential fifth season as well.

Reception

Ratings
In its third season, Homeland became the first series on Showtime to surpass seven million total viewers weekly. The season finale, "The Star", was the highest rated episode of the series to date, with 2.38 million viewers for the original broadcast.

Critical response
The third season received mixed reviews from critics, with many of the criticisms targeted at the second half. The first two episodes received a Metacritic score of 77 out of 100, based on 23 reviews, but reviews became more mixed as the season progressed. On Rotten Tomatoes, the season has an approval rating of 80% with an average score of 7.9 out of 10 based on 40 reviews. The website's critical consensus reads, "As the stakes get higher, Homeland remains a roller coaster ride of tension, and Claire Danes is riveting in one of the best written thrillers on television."

Tim Goodman of The Hollywood Reporter  wrote that the first two episodes of the season restored his faith in the series, with the emphasis on Carrie and Saul, and that "the writing and acting in the first two episodes are exceptional." Robert Rorke of Newsday wrote that "the third-season premiere Homeland delivers a strong episode that repairs much of the damage done last season to this excellent show" and "In balancing action with character development, Homeland offers something for everyone. The performances, as usual, are excellent." Robert Bianco of USA Today praised the focus on the aftermath of the CIA bombing, and wrote "The result of that change of focus is a return that's quieter than the tone Homeland set when it left us but just as intense, and—when Danes is on screen—just as emotionally wrenching." Matthew Wolfson of Slate wrote "Showing us the long-term impact of the attack on the lives of these characters, whose deep-seated motivations and fears have gradually been revealed to us over the last two seasons, allows Homeland to transcend its tendencies toward the hyperbolic and gives us a reason to suspend our disbelief." 

However, some critics had negative reviews for the season. Morven Crumlish of The Guardian found it tedious: "A half-absorbed piece of fiction will leave the characters floundering in their mid-arc torpor. With no end in sight, though, Carrie and Brody can flounder without me." Gerard O'Donovan of The Daily Telegraph agreed: "The ludicrous plot contortions of this season’s early episodes... had all been such a mess."

Awards and nominations
The season was nominated for Best Drama Series for the 2014 Writers Guild of America Awards. For the 20th Screen Actors Guild Awards, the cast was nominated for Best Drama Ensemble, Claire Danes was nominated for Best Drama Actress, and the series was nominated for Best Stunt Team. For the 66th Primetime Emmy Awards, Claire Danes was nominated for Outstanding Lead Actress in a Drama Series and Mandy Patinkin was nominated for Outstanding Supporting Actor in a Drama Series.

Home media release
Homeland: The Complete Third Season was released as a widescreen region 1 four-disc DVD and three-disc Blu-ray box set in the United States and Canada on September 9, 2014. In addition to the 12 episodes, it includes deleted scenes, audio commentary for "The Star" and two featurettes—"The Tower of David: Filming in Puerto Rico 3" and "The Last Days: Filming the Season Finale". The same set was also released on September 8, 2014, in region 2 and on September 24, 2014, in region 4.

The season is also available for streaming online via Hulu, as of August 1, 2016.

References

External links 
 
 

3
2013 American television seasons